Opaluma is a genus of Australian soldier flies in the subfamily Antissinae.

Species
Opaluma has seven species, all described by Bryan Lessard and Norman Woodley:
O. ednae (Lessard & Woodley, 2020)
O. fabulosa (Lessard & Woodley, 2020)
O. iridescens (Lessard & Woodley, 2020)
O. opulens (Lessard & Woodley, 2020)
O. rupaul (Lessard & Woodley, 2020)
O. sapphira (Lessard & Woodley, 2020)
O. unicornis (Lessard & Woodley, 2020)

References

Stratiomyidae
Taxa described in 2020
Diptera of Australasia